The Women's Shot Put F11-12 had its Final held on September 14 at 19:30.

Medalists

Results

References
Final

Athletics at the 2008 Summer Paralympics
2008 in women's athletics